The marsh tapaculo (Scytalopus iraiensis) is a recently discovered passerine bird which belongs to the genus Scytalopus, a genus of tapaculos. It is also known as the wetland tapaculo or tall-grass wetland tapaculo. It is endemic to Brazil.

Description
It is a small, dumpy bird with broad tail-feathers and a total length of approximately 12.5 cm. The upperparts are plain blackish in colour while the underparts are dark grey. The flanks are slightly barred with brown, at least in young birds. The legs are reddish-brown and the bill is dark. The song includes a long series of short 'tchek' notes. The birds run rapidly and will fly short distances when flushed.

Distribution and habitat
It was first sighted on April 19, 1997 in wetlands beside the Iraí River near Curitiba in southern Brazil. Until recently it was generally believed to be restricted to about two dozen sites in the eastern part of Paraná and Rio Grande do Sul, but has now been discovered in the highlands of Minas Gerais – far north of its previously known range.

It occurs in seasonally flooded grassland in the floodplains of rivers. It inhabits areas of tall (60–180 cm), dense vegetation dominated by sedges (such as Eleocharis) and grasses. It forages at or near ground-level and feeds on small arthropods, mainly insects such as bugs and beetles. Breeding occurs in late spring.

Status and conservation
It is classified as an endangered species due to its small and declining population and destruction of its habitat. Threats include drainage, sand extraction, burning of grassland and the flooding of land due to the construction of dams. Despite the recently discovered populations in Minas Gerais, some of which are within protected areas (the national parks of Serra do Cipó and Serra da Canastra, and the private reserve Serra do Caraça), it has been recommended not downgrading it to a lower threatened status, but it remains to be seen if this will be followed.

References

BirdLife International (2007) Species factsheet: Scytalopus iraiensis. Downloaded from http://www.birdlife.org on 20 June 2007
Bornschein, Marcos Ricardo; Reinert, Bianca Luiza & Pichorim, Mauro (1998) Description, ecology and conservation of a new Scytalopus tapaculo from southern Brazil, with comments regarding the morphology of the family, Ararajuba 6(1):3–36. Downloaded from http://www.ararajuba.org.br on 20 June 2007
Vasconcelos, M. F.; Lopes, L. E.; Hoffmann, D.; Silveira, L. F. & Schunck, F. (2008) Range extension for Marsh Tapaculo Scytalopus iraiensis to the highlands of Minas Gerais, Brazil, with an overview of the species’ distribution. Bull. B.O.C. 128(2): 101–106

marsh tapaculo
Birds of the Atlantic Forest
Endemic birds of Brazil
marsh tapaculo